St. Joseph, Seminole County, Florida, also called St. Joseph's Colony, St. Joseph Colony and St. Josephs, was an attempt to establish a Catholic colony in what is now Sanford, Florida.

References

External links
Map of St. Joseph

Unincorporated communities in Seminole County, Florida